Charles Edward Washington (born January 9, 1964) is a former defensive back in the National Football League.

Career
Washington played with the Green Bay Packers during the 1987 NFL season. He played at the collegiate level at the University of Arkansas.

See also
List of Green Bay Packers players

References

Sportspeople from Topeka, Kansas
Green Bay Packers players
American football defensive backs
Arkansas Razorbacks football players
1964 births
Living people